Miguel António Cabrita Minhava (born 5 November 1983, Lisbon) is a Portuguese former basketball player. He developed his basketball skills from a young age, playing for his hometown and youth basketball club. He later played for CF Belenenses and Spanish side CB L'Hospitalet in 2007–08. Minhava represented Benfica from 2006 to 2013.

Titles

Benfica
 Liga Portuguesa de Basquetebol: 4
2008–09, 2009–10, 2011–12, 2012−13
 Taça da Liga / Hugo dos Santos: 2
2010–11, 2012−13
 Supertaça: 3
 2008–09, 2009–10, 2012−13
António Pratas Trophy: 3
2007-08, 2008–09, 2011–12
Supertaça Portugal-Angola: 1
2009–10

References

External links
 FIBA Profile
 EuroBasket 2011 Profile

1983 births
Living people
Sportspeople from Lisbon
Point guards
Portuguese men's basketball players
Portuguese expatriate basketball people in Spain
S.L. Benfica basketball players
CB L'Hospitalet players